The Red Tour was the third concert tour by American singer-songwriter Taylor Swift, in support of her fourth studio album, Red (2012). The tour started on March 13, 2013, at CenturyLink Center in Omaha, Nebraska and concluded on June 12, 2014, at Singapore Indoor Stadium in Singapore. The tour received 1.7 million attendees and grossed $150.2 million in revenue.

The tour received positive reviews from music critics, many praising Swift's performances. As well as being Swift's most successful tour at the time, the Red Tour also received four tour award nominations, of which it won one.

Background 

On October 25, 2012, in partnership with ABC News on the prime-time TV special All Access Nashville with Katie Couric – A Special Edition of 20/20, Swift announced that she would launch a North American stadium and arena tour in early 2013 in support of her fourth studio album, Red (2012).

Swift told Billboard: "Of course, you know the tour will be a big representation of this record". "I'm so excited to see what songs the fans like the most and which ones jump to the forefront, because that's the first step. We always see which songs are really the passionate songs and the ones the fans are freaking out over the most, and those are the ones that are definitely in the set list. I can't wait for that."

Swift used Lenny Kravitz's version of "American Woman" as her entrance song. She sang a cover of The Lumineers's "Ho Hey" nightly, intertwined with her own "Stay Stay Stay".

On May 24, 2014, BEC-Tero, who had been acting as a promoter for the Bangkok stop of the show, announced that the show had been canceled due to the current political unrest in the area. Swift took to Twitter to express her sadness over the cancellation, stating "I'm so sad about the concert being canceled... [S]ending my love to the fans in Thailand."

Critical reception

The tour received positive reviews from many music critics, with many citing Swift's atmospheric performances as a specific area of praise. Writing for the Rolling Stone, Rob Sheffield praised Swift's "emotional excess [and] musical reach", stating "...[n]o other pop auteur can touch her right now." Rebecca Nicholson of The Guardian gave a 5-star review, stating Swift was "staggeringly nice" and a "consummate crowd pleaser". Digital Spy contributor Emma Dibdin stated the tour combined "whimsical spectacle with Swift's trademark emotional intimacy," and that it "capitalises on exactly what makes Swift such a powerful figure for her audience, the sincere blend of aspirational and relatable." In a more negative review, Rebecca Ford of the Hollywood Reporter stated that the intros before specific songs that, while "an appropriate fit for the audience," felt long and "brought down the energy of the show." Ford also mentioned that while Swift's voice "has gotten stronger over the years... [it] still has a habit of faltering or being too soft to hear over the band."

Accolades

Records 
Swift became the first solo female artist in 20 years to headline a national stadium tour through Australia, with the last being Madonna's The Girlie Show in 1993. Swift performed to a crowd of over 40,900 fans at the Sydney Football Stadium in Sydney, Australia, becoming the first female artist in history to sell out the stadium since it was opened in 1988.

The Red Tour also became the highest-grossing tour by a country artist in history at the time, bringing in $150 million and surpassing the prior record held by Tim McGraw and Faith Hill's co-headlining Soul2Soul II Tour, which earned $141 million.

Set list 

The following set list is representative of the show on March 13, 2013, in Omaha, Nebraska. It is not representative of all concerts throughout the tour.

"State of Grace"
"Holy Ground"
"Red"
"You Belong with Me"
"The Lucky One"
"Mean"
"Stay Stay Stay" (contains excerpts from "Ho Hey")
"22"
"I Almost Do"
"Everything Has Changed" (with Ed Sheeran)
"Begin Again"
"Sparks Fly"
"I Knew You Were Trouble"
"All Too Well"
"Love Story"
"Treacherous"
Encore
"We Are Never Ever Getting Back Together"

Tour dates

Cancelled show

Notes

References

External links

2013 concert tours
2014 concert tours
Taylor Swift concert tours
Concert tours of North America
Concert tours of Oceania
Concert tours of Europe
Concert tours of Asia
Concert tours of the United States
Concert tours of Canada
Concert tours of New Zealand
Concert tours of Australia
Concert tours of the United Kingdom
Concert tours of Germany
Concert tours of China
Concert tours of Japan
Concert tours of Indonesia
Concert tours of the Philippines
Concert tours of Singapore
Concert tours of Malaysia